Thomas Henry Burgmeier (born August 2, 1943) is a former Major League Baseball relief pitcher who played for the California Angels, Kansas City Royals, Minnesota Twins, Boston Red Sox and Oakland A's from 1968 to 1984. He has also served as the pitching coach of the Omaha Royals.

Born in St. Paul, Minnesota, Burgmeier grew up in St. Cloud, Minnesota and attended Cathedral High School.

On August 3, 1980, while playing for the Boston Red Sox, Burgmeier moved from the pitcher's mound to left field with two outs in the bottom of the ninth inning. Skip Lockwood replaced Burgmeier on the mound and retired the final batter to save a 6–4 win over the Texas Rangers. Manager Don Zimmer elected to keep Tom in the game in case the batter got on base—in that case Burgmeier would have returned to the mound to face Mickey Rivers.

References

External links

1943 births
Living people
American League All-Stars
California Angels players
Minnesota Twins players
Oakland Athletics players
Kansas City Royals players
Boston Red Sox players
Baseball players from Saint Paul, Minnesota
Major League Baseball pitchers
Modesto Colts players
Durham Bulls players
San Antonio Bullets players
San Jose Bees players
Seattle Angels players
El Paso Sun Kings players
Omaha Royals players
Kansas City Royals coaches
Sportspeople from Saint Paul, Minnesota
Sportspeople from St. Cloud, Minnesota